Sayyid Muhammad Baqir Al-Mūsawī Al-Muhrī (also spelled Al-Mohri; 25 December 1948 – 4 July 2015) was a Kuwaiti Shi'ite Islamic Scholar, and a representative (wakil) of the majority of the grand Shi'ite maraji'.

Death
Al-Muhri died on 4 July 2015 and is buried in Wadi-us-Salaam cemetery in Najaf.

References

Shia Islamists
1948 births
2015 deaths
Kuwaiti imams
Kuwaiti people of Iranian descent
Kuwaiti Shia Muslims